Češov is a municipality and village in Jičín District in the Hradec Králové Region of the Czech Republic. It has about 200 inhabitants. Češov is known for the Wall of Češov, remnants of a Celtic oppidum.

Administrative parts
The village of Liběšice is an administrative part of Češov.

References

Villages in Jičín District